Something Childish and Other Stories is a 1924 collection of short stories by the writer Katherine Mansfield. It was first published in America as The Little Girl.

This anthology was published after her death by her husband John Middleton Murry. Murry wrote in his introductory note that this volume contains the stories written between Bliss: and Other Stories (1920) and The Garden Party: and Other Stories (1922). The additional stories are the earlier first four stories, plus "Sixpence" (which Mansfield thought sentimental) and "Poison".

Stories 
"The Tiredness of Rosabel" (1908)
"How Pearl Button Was Kidnapped" (1912)
"The Journey to Bruges" (1911)
"A Truthful Adventure" (1911)
"New Dresses" (1912)
"The Woman at the Store" (1912)
"Ole Underwood" (1913)
"The Little Girl" (1912)
"Millie" (1913)
"Pension Séguin" (1913)
"Violet" (1913)
"Bains Turcs" (1913)
"Something Childish But Very Natural" (1914)
"An Indiscreet Journey" (1920)
"Spring Pictures" (1915)
"Late at Night" (1917)
"Two Tuppenny Ones, Please" (1917)
"The Black Cap" (1917)
"A Suburban Fairy Tale" (1919)
"Carnation" (1918)
"See-Saw" (1917)
"This Flower" (1920)
"The Wrong House" (1919)
"Sixpence" (1921)
"Poison" (1920)

External links 
 Something Childish and other stories at the New Zealand Text Centre
 

1924 short story collections
Short stories by Katherine Mansfield
New Zealand short story collections
Constable & Co. books